Town & Country Village is a shopping center in Arden-Arcade, California, United States (with a Sacramento address) in the Sacramento area. It is located at the northeast corner of Marconi and Fulton Avenues. Town & Country Village was the first suburban, auto-oriented shopping center in the Sacramento metropolitan area and one of the first in the United States, opening in 1946 with 65 shops. It is anchored by Bed Bath & Beyond, Five Below, Ross Dress for Less, Sprouts Farmers Market, T. J. Maxx, Trader Joe's and Ulta Beauty.

History
Town & Country Village, which first opened in September 1946, was designed by John W. Davis, and built by contractor Jeré Strizek (1902–1979). Original tenants included a beauty shop, ice cream bar, appliance stores, a five-and-ten cent store, rustic garden center, doctors' offices, hardware store, bottle shop, grocers, pharmacy, clothing stores, jewelry store, furniture store, post office, bank, photography studio, restaurants and bars, a shoe repair shop, and a movie theater. The center never had a department store anchor nor was it ever enclosed. 

In the 1990s, Town & Country Village was expanded to include more shop space, including a Lucky supermarket. It was later converted to Albertsons in 1999 and Save Mart in 2007. Save Mart was shuttered in March 2016. 

In 2013, Town & Country Village was repurposed into a power center. It involved demolishing a substantial portion of shop space in the rear of the shopping center to make way for big-box stores Ross Dress for Less, T. J. Maxx and Bed Bath & Beyond. In July 2018, Sprouts Farmers Market opened in a portion of the former Save Mart, followed by Five Below in June 2020, opening in another portion. Much of the original 1940s-built shopping center closest to the intersection of Marconi and Fulton remains.

References

External links
Town & Country Village official website
"Town & Country Village", Eichlerific (blog)
Album of Jeré Strizek projects, Flickr

Shopping malls in Sacramento County, California
Power centers (retail) in the United States